Long Way Down (2009) is a studio album released by American hip hop/rock band G. Love and Special Sauce. The album, released in Australia and New Zealand only, is the first release on the band's own label, Philadelphonic Records.

Track listing
 "Peace Love Happiness"
 "Soft & Sweet"
 "Wontcha"
 "Crumble"
 "Who's Got the Weed"
 "Jenny Crash"
 "Lottery"
 "Grandmother"
 "Dream"
 "Long Way Down"
 "Honey"
 "Superhero Brother"

References
 http://www.philadelphonic.com/archives

External links
 Philadelphonic.com

G. Love & Special Sauce albums
2009 albums